The following is a list of companies operating nursing homes in the U.S.:

Association of Jewish Aging Services
Bailey-Boushay House
Brookdale Senior Living
Catholic Health Services
Ecumen
Emeritus Assisted Living
The Evangelical Lutheran Good Samaritan Society
Genesis HealthCare
Gentiva Health Services
H/2 Capital Partners
HCR ManorCare
Humana
Life Care Centers of America
Lillian Booth Actors Home
Motion Picture & Television Country House and Hospital
St. Camillus Health Center
Twelve Oaks Lodge
Veterans Health Administration
Wesley Woods

References 

 The Largest Senior Care Organizations; includes assisted living, nursing homes, CCRC, independent living; sorted by number of facilities.  Assisted Senior Living.  Accessed 2021-03-28 
 California Nursing Home Chains By Ownership Type: Facility and Resident Characteristics, Staffing, and Quality Outcomes in 2015. See APPENDIX A California Chains: Description and Background.  Ross L and Harrington C.  University of California San Francisco, Department of Social and Behavioral Sciences.  Accessed 2021-03-28

Retirement in the United States
Companies
Nursing homes